Airborne leaflet propaganda is a form of psychological warfare in which leaflets (flyers) are scattered in the air.

Military forces have used aircraft to drop leaflets to attempt to alter the behavior of combatants and non-combatants in enemy-controlled territory, sometimes in conjunction with air strikes. Humanitarian air missions, in cooperation with leaflet propaganda, can turn the populace against their leadership while preparing them for the arrival of enemy combatants.

Functions of leaflet propaganda

There are six different functions of airborne leaflet propaganda that have been used over the past century:
 Threaten destruction
 Warn enemy combatants and non-combatants that their area will be targeted. This has the dual purpose of reducing collateral damage and encouraging enemy combatants and non-combatants (who may be engaged in wartime production) to abandon their duties, reducing the target's military effectiveness.
 Prompt the enemy to surrender
 Explain to prospective deserters how to surrender.
 Offer rewards
 Rewards could be offered to encourage individuals to provide assistance, or to encourage defection.
Disseminate or counter disinformation
 Reduce enemy morale through propaganda.
 Neutralize enemy propaganda.
 Advise radio listeners about frequencies/times of propaganda broadcasts and methods for circumventing radio jamming.
 Facilitate communication
 Create a friendly atmosphere for the enemy by promoting the leaflets dropper's ideologies or to convince the enemy of "noble intentions" 
 Provide humanitarian assistance
 Inform people where to find airdropped food, how to open and consume it, and when it comes.

History

Early use
Airborne leaflets have been used for military propaganda purposes at least since the 19th century. One early example is from the Franco-Prussian War when, in October 1870 during the Siege of Paris, a French balloon coming from the city dropped government proclamations over North German Confederation troops that stated the following (in German):

Paris defies the enemy. The whole of France rallies. Death to the invaders. Foolish people, shall we always throttle one another for the pleasure and proudness of Kings? Glory and conquest are crimes; defeat brings hate and desire for vengeance. Only one war is just and holy; that of independence.

Leaflet propaganda has been delivered by airplanes since the Italo-Turkish War of 1911–12.

First World War
Aerial leaflets were first used on a large scale during World War I by all parties. The British dropped packets of leaflets over Imperial German Army trenches containing postcards from prisoners of war detailing their humane conditions, surrender notices and general propaganda against Kaiser Wilhelm II and the German generals. By the end of the war MI7b had distributed almost 26 million leaflets.

In August 1918, the famous Italian nationalist writer, poet and fighter pilot Gabriele D'Annunzio, organized the Flight over Vienna: a famous propaganda operation during the war, leading 9 Ansaldo SVA planes in a 1,100-kilometre (700 mi) round trip to drop 50,000 propaganda leaflets on the Austro-Hungarian capital.

The Germans began shooting the leaflet-dropping pilots, prompting the British to develop an alternative method of delivery. A. Fleming invented the unmanned leaflet balloon in 1917, and these were used extensively in the latter part of the War, with over 48,000 units produced. The hydrogen balloon would drift over no-man's land to land in the enemy trenches.

At least one in seven of these leaflets were not handed in by the soldiers to their superiors, despite severe penalties for that offence. Even General Paul von Hindenburg admitted that "Unsuspectingly, many thousands consumed the poison" and POWs admitted to being disillusioned by the propaganda leaflets that depicted the use of German troops as mere cannon fodder. In 1915, the British began airdropping a regular leaflet newspaper Le Courrier de l'Air for civilians in German-occupied France and Belgium.

World War II

Distribution of airborne leaflet propaganda was used by both Allied and Axis forces in the Second World War, starting with a Royal Air Force leaflet drop over the port of Kiel in September 1939. During the Phoney War most of the Royal Air Force's operations consisted of airborne leaflet dropping, as the United Kingdom wanted Nazi Germany to be the first country to begin strategic bombing of civilian areas in order to avoid deterring neutral powers such as the United States from supporting the Allies.

The first proposal to construct a special bomb with which to disperse airborne leaflets was put forward by British air force officers during World War II. The most successful "leaflet bomb" model of the War was the Monroe bomb, invented in 1943 by USAAF Captain James Monroe of the 305th Bombardment Group. It was developed from laminated paper containers that had been used to transport M-17 incendiary bombs.

The British improved the use of hydrogen balloons to carry leaflets over German lines. Some of the V-1 flying bombs launched by the Germans against southern England carried leaflets – they were contained in a cardboard tube at the tail of a missile. This would be ejected by a small gunpowder charge while the V1 was in mid-air, en route to its target.

Allied airborne leaflets printed during WWII were "factual, in the main truthful, and served (or so it was claimed) to create a reputation for reliability both in supplying information and refuting German accounts which we said to be untruthful". Often the leaflets did not reach their intended targets because they were dropped from such high altitudes and often drifted over lakes and rural areas. Furthermore, there were various elements which made dropping leaflets on targets difficult, like slow airspeed, short range, and case of attack by enemy. Also, a navigation system was in the middle of developing, and improving the accuracy of leaflet drop was difficult at that time.

Although leaflets were seen as being an effective tactic in manipulating troops when morale was low, "During the early months of the war, leaflets or pamphlets were scattered over enemy territory by aircraft and balloons but it was more than doubtful whether these had any useful effect, their obvious defects being that few can have reached their targets and, being printed, they were sometimes out of date by the time they were ready to distribute. The front-line distribution of leaflets was quite another matter and these were dropped by aircraft or fired by shells, the messages they bore being less careful about the general principles of consistency and frankness and only truthful about matters on which the enemy had contradictory information". It was found that psychological warfare was not effective when distributing surrender leaflets to an enemy which currently had a high morale amongst its troops. Despite the limitation of airborne leaflets' ineffectiveness on opposing sides with high morale, enemies used this tactic "to cause the men to begin talking to each other about their poor military position, their desire to stay alive for their families' sakes, and the reasonableness of honorable surrender", which often led men to desert their troops. However, according to Noel Monks who was a correspondent for the London Daily mail, many German soldiers caught surrender passes which were provided by the US even though a punishment was settled if German people pick up US leaflets. German authorities punished their militaries and civilians who possessed US leaflets by killing them by gun in case of the military and sending them to prison for 2 months in case of citizens. In spite of that, 75% of German people, or 11,302 out of 12,000 who had a surrender pass from the US, surrendered in fact.

One example of German propaganda leaflets which appealed to American troops was one that depicted a passionate kiss between a man and woman. The leaflet read: "FAREWELL Remember her last kiss ... ? Gee were you happy then ... ! Together, you spent marvelous times ..., lounging on beaches ..., dancing, enjoying parties galore ..., listening to the tunes of your favorite band ...". The leaflet's back side reminds the soldier that his loved one is longing for him and that most of the men he had come with are now dead. In comparison, one Allied propaganda leaflet simply showed a picture of a large open field with thousands of German graves.

James A.C. Brown, a Scottish psychiatrist, summed up the WW2 experience with the observation that "Propaganda is successful only when directed at those who are willing to listen, absorb the information, and if possible act on it, and this happens only when the other side is in a condition of lowered morale and is already losing the campaign."

Before the B-29's exclusive deployment to the Pacific Theater began, the United States Army Air Forces initiated a disinformation campaign through leaflets over the Third Reich early in 1944 that hinted at what sorts of American heavy bombers were likely to appear over Germany in the future. Partly in conjunction with use of YB-29-BW 41-36393, the so-called Hobo Queen, one of the service test aircraft flown around several British airfields in early 1944, four-page German language Sternenbanner-headlined, American-published propaganda leaflets mentioning a "battle of annihilation against the Luftwaffe", dated to Leap Year Day in 1944, were dropped over the Reich, with the intent to deceive the Germans into believing that the B-29 would be deployed to Europe.

Leaflets were also used by the USAAF on Japan during the Pacific War. To create leaflets, not only specialists of Japan but also Japanese prisoners of war were involved in this psychological warfare, and more than 500 million leaflets were provided in Japan by USAAF during the Pacific War. The leaflet aimed to not criticize Japan overall but to make citizens possess hostility toward Japanese military commanders. In mid-1945 it became apparent that B-29 bombers of the USAAF were raiding Japan's cities without meeting significant resistance. General Curtis LeMay, commander of the XXI Bomber Command, part of the Twentieth Air Force, consequently ordered the dropping of leaflets hoping to reduce the needless killing of innocent people. One of the leaflets dropped on targeted Japan's cities, with the text on the back, read:

Read this carefully as it may save your life or the life of a relative or a friend. In the next few days, some or all of the cities named on the reverse side will be destroyed by American bombs. These cities contain military installations and workshops or factories, which produce military goods. We are determined to destroy all of the tools of the military clique that they are using to prolong this useless war. Unfortunately, bombs have no eyes. So, in accordance with America's well-known humanitarian policies, the American Air Force, which does not wish to injure innocent people, now gives you warning to evacuate the cities named and save your lives.

America is not fighting the Japanese people but is fighting the military clique, which has enslaved the Japanese people. The peace, which America will bring, will free the people from the oppression of the Japanese military clique and mean the emergence of a new and better Japan.

You can restore peace by demanding new and better leaders who will end the War.

We cannot promise that only these cities will be among those attacked, but some or all of them will be, so heed this warning and evacuate these cities immediately.

The purpose of this leaflet is to emphasize that the war responsibility is not Japanese citizens but Japanese military commanders, and to emphasize America's Humanitarianism. On the other hand, although the leaflet says "we are not going to hurt normal citizens", the leaflet which mentioned or warned Hiroshima and Nagasaki before US dropped atomic bomb was not found. It has been estimated that B-29s dropped 10 million propaganda leaflets in May, 20 million in June and 30 million in July. A surrender pass was regarded as the most important and the most difficult propaganda. A surrender pass is which guarantees the safety of soldiers who surrender. In the surrender pass, it was written that if soldiers keep the leaflet and prove surrender, the US side will not treat them terribly. However, there was a difficulty. The Japanese military's commanders directed soldiers to commit suicide if they become prisoners of war. The Japanese government implemented harsh penalties against civilians who kept copies of these leaflets. On the other hand, US soldiers could pick up leaflets from Japan freely and some of them took away leaflets as a souvenir.

During the Pacific War, US psychological strategy was to divide Japanese commanders and soldiers, and to decrease morale of them.

There were several types of leaflets produced by OWI (Office War Information) in the US. One of the famous leaflets is Kirihitoha (桐一葉) [One leaf of paulownia] which was suggested by Ayako Ishigaki  who was a Japanese critic and conducted anti-Japan war movement in the US before the war. This leaflet was a transformation of a famous Japanese poem. When it was designed, Ayako Ishigaki seemed to have hoped for the end of the war. However, according to W. H. de Roos, who was in charge of Australia's propaganda to Japan in the Far East Liaison Bureau, due to a choice of words that were not appropriate and  the design could be seen not as autumn leaves but tobacco leaves, Kirihitoha was not able to appeal to the Japanese people.

Another famous leaflet is Unga-naizō (運賀無蔵) [Unlucky man] which is consisted as one story. The designer was Tato Yajima, who was a painter and a communist. The story of this leaflet illustrates the idea that soldiers die meaninglessly but the military commander earns well. Furthermore, there is a statement that "who took away the sons from mothers? Who uses their lives as stepping stones?". However, the leaflet was assessed badly by the Japanese leaflet design department. It was pointed out that the picture style is outdated, the core of the story should not be clarified, and the background of the story is not suitable for the present. In addition, according to Linebarger who wrote "Psychological war", there was no remarkable effect by this leaflet.

The US side also created leaflets which utilized Japanese superstition. Gyoen-no-asa (御苑の朝) [Morning in the imperial garden], one of the leaflets, attempted to persuade Japanese people by their loyalty for the emperor. It was well known that if the emperor's honor was damaged, Japanese people would be infuriated, so the US side was careful for that aspect. The leaflet is written that "even though the emperor hopes for peace, Japanese military leaders focus on their self-interests and deceive the emperor" and it is aimed at Japanese civilians losing their motivation toward the war.

There was also a characteristic theme in the US leaflet which was to promote the rebellious spirit of Japanese people toward Germany. Some leaflets pointed to an internal discord by expressing that "Hitler will betray Japan". Besides, the US side decided to drop leaflets at areas which were dominated by Japan because they thought Japanese soldiers in those areas may have more free time to read leaflets compared with areas where fights are conducted harshly.

Leaflets of the enemy country were sometimes used as a strategy to raise hostility towards the enemy country. The US and Japan utilized each other's leaflet. They claimed in their own country's leaflet that "people in the US/Japan insult us, so we should hate them" while showing the enemy's leaflet.

During the Pacific War, the Japanese military sprinkled airborne leaflets to promote surrender and lose fighting spirit. To attract the attention of people who find leaflets, manga artists were involved because it was guessed that only proclamation of a rigid military commander might not work well. Furthermore, the Japanese leaflet design department interviewed knowledgeable people about US and detective writers, like Yūsuke Tsurumi and Ranpo Edogawa, to study and design leaflets.

After the Pacific War, US psychological strategy's aim shifted to Japanese civilians. They cherished telling the truth and avoiding criticizing the Japanese emperor. By telling the truth, they expected that it could keep the credibility of information on the leaflet and cause disappointment toward the present situation of war. Moreover, treating Japanese citizens and the Japanese emperor as victims of the war was another strategy of psychological warfare. They expressed that the emperor and citizens are pacifist, but the cabinet which caused the war is evil in their leaflet. Leaflets also accused the Japanese government of disturbing the peace between the emperor and citizens. The Japanese emperor is an existence who a top of Japan in terms of spirit. He had been treated as a god, and there was a manner to write his name and to speak of his picture, where to live, name of his body, and so on. Therefore, if the leaflet would hurt the Japanese emperor's dignity, Japanese people couldn't accept the contents of the leaflet. Instead, the US side pointed up the inefficiency of the Japanese cabinet and tried to weaken their credibility.

As one of the leaflets by the US which was given to Japanese civilians, a leaflet which resembles a Japanese money bill and included the message on the back was created. This money leaflet can draw the attention of people who find the leaflet and prompt them to read by utilizing human's natural characteristics which favor money. In addition, there was an intention to cause inflation in Japan by dropping fake money without such a psychological message for civilians. That fake bill was produced secretly Operation "Toy Horse" in California. These fake bills appeared in a Japanese newspaper.

After the war, the US sent 1,150 people to Japan to search about the result of psychological warfare by leaflet propaganda. According to the survey, 49% of Japanese people answered that they saw the leaflet during the war. For the reaction of civilians, they did not care about leaflets from the US and they felt the contents of leaflets were childish at first. That can say early leaflet propaganda strategy by the US was unsuccessful. However, the result was starting to appear around the end of the war. The US dropped the leaflet which clarified the fact that Japan is overwhelmed by the US, the present predicament such as food shortage, and a fear of air raids. As a result, the worse the war situation was getting, the more Japanese people were affected by the leaflet.

For the reaction of the Japanese government toward the leaflet dropped by the US, they showed much reaction according to Kiyoshi Kiyosawa who was a Diplomatic critic and journalist. Basically, the counterplan was settled after leaflets were dropped. The Japanese government issued the rule that people who find leaflets must submit it to the government. If the leaflet would not be submitted, the person was sent to the prisons for 3 months or had to pay a penalty. At first, 70 or 80% leaflets were submitted, but it was not reached 50% around the end of the war. As another government deal, popular persons announced the warning about leaflets in newspapers, magazines, and street speech. They said "do not read, do not listen to the US leaflet" to normal citizens. After a while, the Japanese government tried to spread fake information about the US strategy that the US military drops chocolates with poisons and pencils with bomb and they are willing to kill even children. However, there was no evidence that the US military dropped such goods, so it was just a lie as one solution by the government toward the US leaflet strategy. It was called the "atrocity stories" strategy that emphasizing cruelty of people in enemy countries, and the strategy was used well in other countries after World War 1. The effect of US leaflets can be seen during  the controversy of whether Japan should surrender or continue resistance. Because the leaflets might cause the riot of soldiers who read it, the Japanese emperor decided to surrender.

After World War II

Even though leaflet propaganda has been an effective "weapon", its use has been on a decline. This decline is a result of the advance of satellite, television, and radio technology. Six billion leaflets were dropped in Western Europe and 40 million leaflets dropped by the United States Army Air Forces over Japan in 1945 during World War II. One billion were used during the Korean War while only 31 million were used in the Iraq War. Other conflicts where leaflet propaganda has been used are Vietnam, Afghanistan (both during the Soviet and more recent NATO invasions), and the Gulf War. Coalition forces dropped pamphlets encouraging Iraqi Army troops not to fight during the first Gulf War, which contributed to eighty-seven thousand Iraqi troops surrendering in 1991.

During the 2011 enforcement of a NATO No-Fly Zone over Libya, the Royal Canadian Air Force and U.S. Air Force used C-130J Hercules and CP-140 Aurora aircraft to broadcast radio signals and drop leaflets over Gaddafi controlled areas. The messages predominantly asked Muammar Gaddafi's troops to return to their families and homes for their safety, but also included the message: "The forces of the Gaddafi regime are violating United Nations Resolution 1973." Some messages called on the troops to stop hostilities and not to harm their compatriots, while other messages broadcast by NATO included female voices asking Gaddafi's forces to "stop killing children".
Leaflet propaganda was also used in the Syrian civil war to deter possible ISIS recruits from joining in 2015.

Means of delivery
 Releasing the leaflets can be as simple as having one or more of the aircraft's crew throw bundles of paper from an open hatchway.

A more sophisticated method is the leaflet bomb: a bomb-shaped but non-explosive container that drops from the aircraft and opens in mid-air to disperse leaflets – up to tens of thousands of leaflets per "bomb". U.S. leaflet bombs include the PDU-5B dispenser unit, the LBU30 and the older M129E1/E2. The M129 weighs  when empty and about  loaded. It can contain 60,000 to 80,000 leaflets. At a pre-determined time after release, the two halves of the bomb's outer shell are blown apart by detonating cord, dispersing the leaflet payload. Soviet/Russian leaflet bombs include the AGITAB-250-85 and the AGITAB-500-300 (used during the First Chechen War).

Use of leaflet bombs by revolutionary groups
Leaflet bombs have not only been used by states for purposes of military warfare but have, since the 1940s, also been used by radical political and ideological sub-state groups.

Zionist as well as Anti-colonial groups in Asia and Africa
The use of leaflet bombs by non-state groups began during the Jewish insurgency in Mandatory Palestine in 1945 when Irgun developed a bomb that was "deposited in the street, ticked away until detonation, then scattered news sheet over a wide and smoky area". In September 1945 three of Irgun's leaflet bombs exploded in Jerusalem and injured nine people.

In the late 1960s the African National Congress (ANC) started to use a version of the leaflet bomb in the internal resistance to apartheid in South Africa. This bomb was developed in collaboration with the South African Communist Party (SACP) and South Africans living in exile in London. The first time this leaflet bomb, known to South African activists as the "bucket bomb" and to the South African police forces as the "ideological bomb", was used was in 1967. This was one of the most important propaganda weapons of the ANC who devoted major resources to it and used it frequently during the 1960s and 1970s, spreading tens of thousands of leaflets. A 1970 article from the ANC's journal Sechaba, looking back at the uses of leaflets as propaganda in the 1960s, stated:

It was in this new period that underground propaganda, demonstrating the effectiveness of the ANC machinery and projecting its voice, became of incalculable value. Underground leaflets began to appear in the townships, factories and city streets. Passed on from hand to hand, these reminded the people that the spirit of resistance must never die. These were often complemented by slogans painted on walls proclaiming: "Free Mandela", "Free Sisulu" and "Long Live the ANC". As modest as these propaganda efforts were ... they showed that the ANC could survive the most severe measures of the regime.

The South African press and security forces also saw it as a serious weapon of the ANC and there were threats from the police to take action against the South African press for publishing parts of ANC's leaflets. The South African Minister of Police was quoted in a South African newspaper thus: "the explosions are an indication that subversive elements are still active" inside South Africa and warned the public that they "must not think the dangers are a thing of the past. It is something with which we will just have to live."

New left groups in Latin America
The leaflet bomb has been relatively popular in Latin America with several recorded uses by various groups advocating political violence.

In the 1980s the FMLN in the Salvadoran Civil War used this technology under the name of "propaganda bomb". It was one of the "favorite tactics" of its urban militia groups and preferably used in public places like markets or public parks. The design of the bomb was adapted to the local environment in that it

consisted of a cardboard box with a small, low-power explosive underneath a large number of propaganda leaflets. The explosive was set off by a homemade time igniter. The box was disguised to look like any ordinary package or box that might be carried by someone going or returning from a trip to the marketplace.

The use of leaflet bombs played a part in the FMLN's recruitment process known to them as fogueo – which meant to experience fire or fire-harden something – which was the process by which the recruits "were toughened and the weak and fainthearted were weeded out". The fogueo process was

a very carefully designed program of increasingly risky operations in support of the guerilla movement. As the candidates successfully completed each operation, it gave them confidence to carry out the next danger level of operation until they became full-fledged guerilla combatants.

This process began with low-level information-gathering and propaganda activities in support of FMLN where the culminating activity before being ready for "combat military activity" could be the making and exploding of a leaflet bomb.

In Honduras, the Popular Movement for Liberation (MPL) and Morazanist Patriotic Front (FPM) also used propaganda bombs during the 1990s.

The Guatemalan National Revolutionary Unity in the Guatemalan Civil War also used leaflet bombs. In 1996 the group occupied a radio station and set off a leaflet bomb.

In Ecuador several groups have used leaflet bombs. The Revolutionary Armed Corps (CAR) was according to the Ecuadorian police "an extreme leftist group" which is only known for one attempted attack on February 20, 2001, when a leaflet bomb containing 150 pamphlets was discovered and successfully defused by the police.

The communist Group of Popular Combatants (GCP) has used leaflet bombs on several occasions during 2001–2005. In 2001 it was blamed by authorities for a pamphlet bomb and later the same year the group claimed responsibility for detonating a pamphlet bomb in downtown Quito that let out hundreds of pamphlets protesting against Plan Colombia. In 2002 the Revolutionary Armed Forces of Ecuador set off a leaflet bomb in an Arcos Dorados restaurant in Guayaquil that injured three people and caused severe damage to the property.

Advantages of leafleting 
 The printed words on the leaflets were more authoritative before the advances in technology.
 One leaflet has the potential to reach many civilians.
 Leaflets can be hidden and easily destroyed in case of emergency.
 Leaflets can bypass circumvention techniques used to block other forms of propaganda, such as radio jamming.

Disadvantages 
 Due to illiteracy not all civilians are capable of reading the leaflets.
 In order to have accurate delivery, aircraft need to fly at low altitudes and low speeds making them easier targets for the enemy.
 Leaflets can be destroyed or altered by the enemy.
 Messages must cater to the cultural norm of society.
 Weather conditions can alter the message being delivered to civilians.

See also
 Operation Cornflakes: A more subtle propaganda operation in World War II involving inserting propaganda leaflets by air into the mail system of Nazi Germany.

References

Bibliography
 Brockmann, R.J., & Sinatra, S. (1995). How the iterative process helped the Allies win the Persian Gulf War. STC Intercom, 42 (9), 1, 44.
 Clark, Andrew M. and Christie, Thomas B.  "Ready ... Ready ... Drop".  Gazette:  The International Journal For Communication Studies.  2005, London. Sage Publications.
 Friedman, Herbert A.  "Falling Leaves".  Print:  Krause Publications, 2003.
 .
 Garnett, David A. (1947), The Secret History of PWE: The Political Warfare Executive 1939–1945, St Ermins Press. 2002.
 Haulman, Dr. Daniel L.  "USAF Psychological Operations, 1990–2003".  Air Force Historical Research Agency, 2003.
 .
 Oyen, Orjar and De Fleur, Melvin L.  "The spatial Diffusion of an Airborne Leaflet Message".  The American Journal of Sociology, Vol. 59, No 2.  Sep., 1953, 144–149.
 .
 Richards, Lee.  PsyWar.Org
 Schmulowitz, Nat and Luckmann, Lloyd D.  "Foreign Policy by Propaganda Leaflets".  The Public Opinion Quarterly, Vol. 9, No. 4.  1945–1946.
 .

External links
 PsyWar.Org - The history of psychological warfare with a large collection of aerial propaganda leaflets 
 WW2 propaganda - Allied and Axis leaflets: A website about airdropped, shelled or rocket fired propaganda leaflets in World War 2.
 DXing.info - leaflets in Iraq in 2003

Psychological warfare techniques
Propaganda techniques by medium
Pamphlets
Aviation mass media